Daryl Haggard is an American-Canadian astronomer and Associate Professor of Physics in the Department of Physics at McGill University and the McGill Space Institute.

Early life and education 
Haggard was born in Seattle, Washington, the fifth of eight children, and moved to Santa Fe, New Mexico at 6 months of age. Haggard's father was a mathematician and college professor. Her mother trained as biologist and owns a native plant nursery in Santa Fe.

She studied at St. John's College, receiving a Bachelors of Arts in philosophy and mathematics in May 1995. She became fascinated by orbital mechanics after reading Newton's Principia and realizing that mathematical equations could describe the orbits of planets.

In 2004, Haggard received a Master of Science in Physics from San Francisco State University, where she studied X-ray-emitting binary stars in the globular cluster Omega Centauri. She received a Ph.D. in Astronomy from the University of Washington in 2010. Her thesis work focused on active galactic nuclei (accreting supermassive black holes at the center of distant galaxies).

Career 
After completing her Ph.D., Haggard accepted a postdoctoral fellowship at the Center for Interdisciplinary Exploration and Research in Astrophysics (CIERA) at Northwestern University. She spent one year as an Assistant Professor of Astronomy in the Physics and Astronomy Department at Amherst College, before accepting an Assistant Professor position at McGill University and joining the newly formed McGill Space Institute in 2015.

Daryl Haggard's research group uses radio, submillimeter, near infrared, and X-ray telescopes to study compact objects, including active galactic nuclei, Sagittarius A* (the supermassive black hole at the center of the Milky Way galaxy) and the mergers of neutron stars.

In 2017, she led a team that used the Chandra X-ray Observatory to detect the afterglow of the merger of two neutron stars, GW170817, the first detection of X-rays from a gravitational wave source. Follow-up observations of the merger remnant by Haggard's group in 2017 showed the remnant grew brighter, rather than dimming, as expected. The remnant finally began to fade in X-ray observations taken in 2018, 260 days after the merger.

She is currently a member of the Canadian Joint Committee on Space Astronomy, the Event Horizon Telescope Multiwavelength Coordination Team and the Thirty Meter Telescope International Science Development Team. Haggard had also served on the American Astronomical Society (AAS) Governance Task Force, was the editor of the AASWOMEN Newsletter and was elected a member of the AAS High Energy Astrophysics Division (HEAD) Executive Committee.

Awards and recognition 
CIFAR Azrieli Global Scholar (2017–19) 

Kavli Frontiers Fellow (2014–2016) 

CIERA Postdoctoral Fellow  (2010–2014)

Personal life 
Haggard resides in Montreal with her husband Nicolas Benjamin Cowan, an astronomer and planetary scientist. They have one son.

Selected publications

References 

Women astronomers
Living people
20th-century American  astronomers
21st-century Canadian astronomers
21st-century Canadian women scientists
20th-century American women scientists
Academic staff of McGill University
St. John's College (Annapolis/Santa Fe) alumni
San Francisco State University alumni
University of Washington College of Arts and Sciences alumni
Year of birth missing (living people)
American women academics
21st-century American women scientists
Canadian women physicists